USFAS Bamako is a Malian football club based in Bamako. They play in the top division in Malian football and are owned by the Malian Army. Their home stadium is Stade Municipal de USFAS.

Achievements
 Malien Cup: 1
 1995

Performance in CAF competitions
CAF Cup: 2 appearances
1998 – First Round
2000 – First Round

Current squad

References
Mali 2007/08 Championnat National Première Division
Mali 2006/07 Championnat National Première Division Rec.Sport.Soccer Statistics Foundation, retrieved 2008-03-04. Rec.Sport.Soccer Statistics Foundation, retrieved 2008-03-04.
Mali – List of Champions Rec.Sport.Soccer Statistics Foundation, retrieved 2008-03-04.
Mali – List of Cup Winners Rec.Sport.Soccer Statistics Foundation, retrieved 2008-03-04.

Football clubs in Mali
Sport in Bamako
Association football clubs established in 1965
1965 establishments in Mali